Mộ Đức is a district (huyện) of Quảng Ngãi province in the South Central Coast region of Vietnam. 

As of 2003 the district had a population of 140,133. The district covers an area of 212 km². The district capital lies at Mộ Đức. It is served by Mo Duc High School.

References

Districts of Quảng Ngãi province